Ugorsko is a village in Vogošća municipality, near Sarajevo, Federation of Bosnia and Herzegovina, Bosnia and Herzegovina.

Demographics 
According to the 2013 census, its population was 1,017.

References

Populated places in Vogošća